Sherford is a new town under construction in Devon, England. Part of the land for development lies within Plymouth and the rest with the South Hams.

Development on the site was originally due to start in 2007 and its first 300 dwellings were to be built in 2009. In August 2015, the construction of the new town started on the first 700 homes after South Hams council accepted a new planning application in December 2011, formal planning permission was granted on 12 November 2013.

Homes will be built by a number of developers including Taylor Wimpey, Linden Homes and Bovis Homes, with progress now managed by specialist development managers Brookbanks.

The project is part funded by a £32 million repayable government loan. A new swimming pool will also be built in the town, which will be the closest pool to the residents of Plymstock. It will include three primary schools, one secondary school, a library, a youth centre, a health centre and a new town centre with retail. The first of the primary schools, Sherford Vale Primary School opened in September 2018.

In total, the new town is expected to create 7000 new jobs.

Once completed, it is expected to have 5,500 dwellings built over the period of 20 years. Over 1000 of the houses will be "low cost" due to the high discrepancy between house prices and wages in the area. The town planning will use traditional urbanisation to make the town carbon neutral by constructing energy efficient buildings and laying out the town so that people live close to a main street.  The aim is that shops, schools and businesses will be within walking distance of residents' homes. Whilst excavating the site, an ancient settlement was discovered, believed to be over 3000 years old.

In February 2022, archaeologists led by Rob Bourn, managing director of Orion Heritage announced the discovery of the remains of a woolly mammoth, reindeer, rhinoceros, bison, wolf and hyena in a cave system near the town. Over 200 clusters of bones have been removed by the explorers to analyze the life in Ice Age Britain. Remains of a tusk, molar tooth, other bones of a wooly mammoth, a partial skull and mandible of a woolly rhinoceros date to the middle of the last Ice Age between 60,000 and 30,000 years ago.

References

External links 
Information about Sherford

External links
  www.Sherford.org - Sherford Community Forum

Populated places in Devon
New towns in England
New towns started in the 2010s